FKW may refer to:

 Folkestone West railway station (National Rail station code), a railway station in Kent, England
 Kassel-Wilhelmshöhe station (DS100 code), a railway station in Hesse, Germany